Chan Yung-jan and Zheng Jie won in the final of this tournament. They defeated Anastasia and Arina Rodionova 6–7(4), 6–2, [10–7].

Seeds

Draw

Draws

External links
Doubles Draw

Malaysian Open - Doubles
2010 Doubles